Malhada dos Bois is a municipality located in the Brazilian state of Sergipe. Its population was 3,699 (2020) and its area is 62 km².

References

Municipalities in Sergipe